Elections to Mole Valley Council were held on 4 May 2006. One third of the council was up for election and the Conservative Party gained overall control of the council from no overall control. Overall turnout was 49.0%.

After the election, the composition of the council was:
Conservative 23
Liberal Democrat 15
Independent 3

Election result

Ward results

References
2006 Mole Valley election result
Ward results

2006
2006 English local elections
2000s in Surrey